Nork-Marash, is one of the 12 districts of Yerevan, the capital of Armenia. It is located to the east of the city centre.  It is bordered by the Kentron District form the west and the north, Nor Nork from the east and Erebuni from the south. The name of the district is derived from the Nork neighbourhood of Yerevan and the ancient major of Marash in Republic of Turkey. The district is unofficially divided into smaller neighborhoods such as Nork and Nor Marash.

The district was formed in 1996 through the merger of Nork and Nor Marash neighborhoods. It has an area of 4 km² and a population of 12,049 (2011 census).

Streets and landmarks

Main streets
Garegin Hovsepyan street.
Armenak Armenakyan street.
David Bek street.

Landmarks
Holy Mother of God Church, opened in 1995.
Public TV of Armenia and the Yerevan TV Tower.
Nork-Marash Medical Center.

Gallery

References

Populated places in Armenia
Districts of Yerevan